From the Life of the Marionettes is a 1980 television film directed by Ingmar Bergman. The film was produced in West Germany with a German-language screenplay and soundtrack while Bergman was in "tax exile" from his native Sweden. It is filmed in black and white apart from two colour sequences at the beginning and end of the film.

Set in Munich, the film charts the disintegration of the relationship of Katarina and Peter Egermann, based on the unhappy couple of the same names briefly featured in Bergman's 1973 miniseries Scenes from a Marriage. In a reimagining of the characters, Peter and Katarina's unhappiness and unfaithfulness culminates in Peter's murder of a prostitute.

Plot
Peter Egermann visits and murders a prostitute named Ka, committing an act of necrophilia. The coroner interrogates Peter's friends for an explanation. Mogens Jensen tells the coroner he is shocked by the murder, claiming there were no signs this could happen. Peter is married to career woman Katarina; they have no children. In fact, Peter had confided in Jensen that he was plagued with homicidal thoughts, primarily aimed against Katarina. Jensen considered the thoughts likely not serious, but advised Katarina to leave town. Katarina dismissed the warning as preposterous, and given it was a busy season for work, she decided it was impossible for her to leave.

Before the murder, Peter considered suicide by throwing himself from a building, and Katarina called a friend to calm him down. Peter came back inside, where he quarreled with Katarina. The two shared an open relationship, as Katarina seeks other lovers. Peter claimed he is the one who knows how to sexually satisfy Katarina. Katarina responded she sometimes had orgasms with Peter, but also that she sometimes faked them and left the bedroom to masturbate, and that on other occasions she only had small convulsions.

The interrogator questions Tim, a homosexual. Tim is a business partner of Katarina and her friend, and by extension, he also knew Peter. The interrogator asks if Tim ever had an affair with Peter; Tim hesitates before replying no. Agitated, Tim reveals he had desires for Peter, and is suffering a guilty conscience after having introduced Peter to Ka. Ka was one of Tim's friends. Tim blames his homosexuality for bringing Peter and Ka together, saying he had difficulties with Katarina and liked the idea that Peter would cheat on her with a prostitute. Slowly, he thought, he would lure Peter to him.

When Peter met Ka at a Munich peep show, Ka told Peter her real name was Katarina, the same as his wife. He tearfully murdered her. Jensen concludes that Peter, having grown up under an aggressive mother and then lived with a similarly aggressive wife, was unaware of his own latent homosexuality and that meeting Ka disrupted Peter's daily routine and triggered an emotional blackout. Peter is confined to a mental institute, where he cradles a teddy bear at night.

Cast

Production

Development

Ingmar Bergman wrote From the Life of the Marionettes after being arrested in Stockholm in 1976 and subsequently leaving for West Germany. He stated:

He based the lead characters after Peter and Katarina in his 1973 miniseries Scenes from a Marriage. Bergman's initial conception for the project was titled Love for No Lovers, but in the rewrite culminating in From the Life of the Marionettes Peter and Katarina were reimagined as a German couple distinct from the Swedish characters in Scenes from a Marriage. Bergman explained the final title:

In casting, the filmmakers recruited all actors from the Residenztheater.

Filming
The film was shot in the Bavaria Film Studios in Munich, and at Tobis Film Studios, beginning in October 1979. Bergman's regular cinematographer Sven Nykvist returned for the project. Nykvist and Bergman mainly shot in black-and-white, but at the insistence of television broadcaster ZDF, some colour was added and a red tint was given to the prologue for fear the black-and-white would lose viewers.

German composer Rolf A. Wilhelm wrote the score, making use of timpani and glass harmonicas.

Release
The premiere took place in July 1980 at a minor festival in Oxford, with Tobis Film as the main distributor. The film was originally made for television and had its TV premiere on German ZDF on 3 November 1980; it went to German theatres on 6 November. It was subsequently released in Swedish theatres on 24 January 1981.

On 28 January 1981, From the Life of the Marionettes screened on SVT1. The Criterion Collection released a Blu-ray on 20 November 2018, along with 38 other Bergman films, in the set Ingmar Bergman's Cinema.

Reception
According to author Birgitta Steene, Swedish critics were generally  "respectful but not enthusiastic". Janet Maslin credited Bergman for a "forceful" work despite what she found to be "less articulate or analytical" characters, praised Nykvist's shots in dream sequences, and positively reviewed Christine Buchegger and Robert Atzorn's performances. David Denby wrote "I wish [Bergman] had dramatized more and explained a whole lot less". People staff criticized it as "banal" with "no suspense". In his Movie Guide, Leonard Maltin gave the film three and a half stars, describing it as "Powerful, provocative".

The film was nominated for Best Foreign Language Film of the year by the U.S. National Board of Review. It currently holds a 67% approval rating on Rotten Tomatoes, based on 12 reviews. It is one of film-maker Wes Anderson's favourite movies.

References

Bibliography

External links

1980 drama films
1980 films
1980 television films
Films about murder
Films directed by Ingmar Bergman
German drama films
1980s German-language films
German-language television shows
German television films
Necrophilia in film
Films with screenplays by Ingmar Bergman
Swedish drama films
West German films
1980s German films
1980s Swedish films
ZDF original programming